Bang Krabue may refer to:

Bang Krabue, Bangkok, an intersection and neighbourhood in Dusit District, Bangkok
Bang Krabue Subdistrict,  a subdistrict (tambon) in Bang Khonthi District,  Samut Songkhram Province
Bang Krabue Subdistrict,  a subdistrict (tambon) in Mueang Sing Buri District, Sing Buri Province
Bang Krabue Subdistrict,  a subdistrict (tambon) in Sam Khok District, Pathum Thani Province